"Gotta Move On" is a song by American singer Toni Braxton. It was written and produced by Braxton along with Jeremih Felton and Kenneth Coby for her tenth studio album Spell My Name (2020), while production was helmed by Coby under his moniker Soundz, with Paul Boutin and Braxton serving as vocal producers. A slow-burning anthem about getting past a failed relationship, "Gotta Move" features a guitar solo from singer H.E.R. The song was released as the album's third single on August 24, 2020, and became Braxton's eleventh chart topper on the US Adult R&B Songs chart.

Chart performance
"Gotta Move On" reached number one on the US Billboard Adult R&B Songs dated February 20, 2021, becoming Braxton's eleventh chart topper and second single from Spell My Name after "Do It" (2020) to do so, tying her with Alicia Keys for the most number-one singles since the Adult R&B Airplay list began in 1993. Braxton had previously led the rank among all artists for most number ones from 1996 until Keys surpassed her in 2008 and retained sole possession of the feat until 2021. Beyond its success on the Adult R&B Songs, “Gotta Move On” also reached number 12 on the US R&B/Hip-Hop Airplay chart.

Music video
Braxton reteamed with director Mike Ho to film a music video for "Gotta Move On" which was released online on October 23, 2020. In the "cinematic" video, a couple endures a difficult break in their relationship. H.E.R. makes a guest appearance in the clip.

Credits and personnel
Credits lifted from the liner notes of Spell My Name.

 Paul Boutin – engineer, mixing, recording, vocal producer
 Toni Braxton – vocal producer, vocals, writer
 Kenneth Coby – engineer, producer, writer
 Jeremih Felton – writer
 H.E.R. – guitar solo

 Raymon "Big Play Ray" Holten – bass, guitar
 Demonte Posey – programming, strings arrangement 
 Herb Powers, Jr. – mastering
 Erick Walls – additional guitars

Charts

Release history

References

2020 singles
2020 songs
Toni Braxton songs
Island Records singles
Songs written by Toni Braxton
Songs written by Jeremih
Songs written by H.E.R.
Songs written by Soundz